The Costa Rica Fed Cup team represents Costa Rica in Fed Cup tennis competition and are governed by the Federación Costarricense de Tenis. They have not competed since 2018.

History
Costa Rica competed in its first Fed Cup in 1992.  Their best result was finishing fourth in Group II in 2001.

See also
Fed Cup
Costa Rica Davis Cup team

External links

Billie Jean King Cup teams
Fed Cup
Fed Cup

 

The first time they played a game was in 1992.

They have played 15 years in a row.